Anil Chitrakar, is a social entrepreneur. He was recognized as one of the 100 "Global Leaders for Tomorrow" at the World Economic Forum in Davos in 1993. He is the founder of the Environmental Camps for Conservation Awareness (ECCA) and the co-founder of Himalayan Climate Initiative.

Books published
 Take The Lead – Nepal's Future Has Begun 
 Working with NGOs

Awards and nominations
 Ashoka Fellow
 Global Leaders for Tomorrow awardee at the World Economic Forum in Davos (1993)
 Rolex award
 Global Development Marketplace Award for the Solar Tuki at the World Bank (2005)
 Tech Museum Award in Silicon Valley for this work

References

External links
 
 
 

Living people
1961 births
People from Kathmandu
Nepalese male writers
Ashoka Fellows
Nepalese engineers
Nepalese environmentalists
University of Rajasthan alumni
University of Pennsylvania alumni